The following is a timeline of the history of the city of A Coruña, Galicia, Spain.

Prior to 19th century

 4000-2000 BC - Burial constructions in Monte das Arcas
 3rd century BC - Castro de Elviña begins occupation.
 62 BC - Julius Caesar came to the city (then named Brigantium) in pursuit of the metal trade, establishing commerce with what are now France, England and Portugal. 
 2nd century CE - Tower of Hercules built (approximate date).
 9th century - Björn Ironside visited Tower of Hercules looking for gold
 911 - Bermudo II started the construction of military positions in the coast, with a defensive role. A fortress with a permanent garrison was built at Faro, in the ruins of the Tower of Hercules.
 12th century - Igrexa de Santiago (A Coruña) (church) built.
 13th century -   established.
 1208
 Afonso IX founded again Crunia. With the privilege of disembarking and selling salt without paying taxes 
 Construction of  begins.
 1302 -  (church) built.
 1370 - A Coruña was attacked by portuguese
 1386 - A Coruña was attacked by portuguese again
 1397 -  were rebuilt after portuguese attacks
 15th century - City renamed "A Coruña".
 16th century - Palacio de Capitanía de A Coruña is built
 1501 - Catherine of Aragon departs from Port of A Coruña to marry Arthur, Prince of Wales and become Queen of England.
 1563 - A Coruña becomes capital of Galicia, when Philip II granted the city the headquarters of the captaincy and the audience
 1588 - Spanish Armada sails from A Coruña with the purpose of invading England.
 1589 - The Siege of Coruña by the English Armada. Maria Pita lead defense of the city.
 1595 -  (fort) finished (began in 1587).
 1598 - Coruna sacked by English forces.
 1693 - Igrexa de San Xurxo (A Coruña) (church) built (approximate date).
 1722 - A Coruña Aqueduct is built
 1748 - Palacio de Capitanía de A Coruña is rebuilt
 1764 - Royal Maritime Posts of America created, growing in the port and commercial field.
 1765 - Academia de Agricultura del reino de Galicia (learned society) established.
 1775 - Royal Audience of Galicia builds the Archive of the Kingdom of Galicia
 1785 - Consulado (merchant guild) established.
 1790 - Consulado creates first public library in the city following principles of enlightenment.

19th century
 1804 - Fábrica Nacional de Cigarros (National Cigar Factory) created.
 1805 - First stable printing press stablished
 1809 - 16 January: Battle of Corunna.
 1820 - A Coruña "joined the revolutionary movement."
 1823 - City taken by French forces.
 1835 -  (provincial governing body) established.
 1836 - A Coruña "captured by the Carlists."
 1842 - Population: 19,415.
 1854 - Gas lighting network is created.
 1858 - First telegraph line between Rioseco (León) and A Coruña
 1862 - Palacio Provincial rebuilt.(gl)
 1869 - City walls partially dismantled to join neighbourhoods.
 1880s - Electric lighting network is created.
 1882 - La Voz de Galicia newspaper begins publication.
 1875 - First train begins circulation. A Coruña-Lugo line.
 1885 - A Coruña-Madrid train begins  circulation.
 1886 -  Chamber of Commerce established.
 1900 - Population: 43,971.

20th century
 1901 - Marcela and Elisa marry in Igrexa de San Xurxo becoming first same-sex marriage in Spain.
 1902 - A Coruña Aqueduct stops being used
 1903 - First tram begins circulation between Puerta Real and railway station.
 1906 - Deportivo de La Coruña (football club) formed.
 1912
  becomes part of city.
  (city hall) built.
 1916
 Irmandades da Fala (political group) organized.
 1917 - El Ideal Gallego newspaper begins publication.
 1925 - Banco Pastor Building built becoming first skyscraper and tallest building in Spain
 1935 - A Coruña-San Cristovo railway station built.
 1940 - Population: 104,220.
 1943 - A Coruña-Santiago rail line inaugurated.
 1944 - Estadio Riazor (stadium) opens.
 1948 - First trolleybus begins circulation between Plaza de Pontevedra and Monelos.
 1960 - Population: 177,502.
 1962 - Last tram circulates, replaced by trolleybus
 1963 - A Coruña Airport is inaugurated and the first commercial flight lands (May 23)
 1964 - A Coruña Termino train station burned in a fire.
 1965 - First urban bus line.
 1967 - Dique de Abrigo (Shelter Dam) is inaugurated
 1968 -  (museum) established.
 1970 - Pazo dos Deportes de Riazor (arena) opens.
 1973 - Hercón Tower built becoming tallest building in Galicia (119 meters).
 1975 - First Zara store opens its doors.
 1979 - Last trolleybus operates in the city
 1981 - Population: 232,356.
 1989 - University of A Coruña established.
 1991 - Coliseum da Coruña and Centro Galego de Artes da Imaxe (film archive) open.
 1992
 Orquesta Sinfónica de Galicia (orchestra) formed.
 Aegean Sea tanker oil spill
 A Coruña Sea Promenade inaugurated.
 1994 - Ronda de Outeiro (Second Ring Road) finished.
 1995 - Domus (museum) opens.
 1998 -  begins.
 1999 - Aquarium Finisterrae opens.
 2000 
  newspaper begins publication.
 SuperDepor wins La Liga.

21st century
 2001 - R (cable operator) begins operations and spreads fiber optic network across the city.
 2007 -  begins operating.
 2009 - Bicicoruña public bicycle sharing system created.
 2011 - Population: 245,053.
 2012 - National Museum of Science and Technology (MUNCYT) opens.
 2015 
  becomes mayor.
 Third Ring Road opens.
 2019 - Bike lanes reach 35 km

See also
 History of A Coruña
 
 Timeline of Galician history

References

This article incorporates information from the Spanish Wikipedia and Galician Wikipedia.

Bibliography

in English

in Spanish

External links

  (city archives)
 Items related to A Coruña, various dates (via Europeana)

History of A Coruña
Coruna